Veiga (meaning meadow in Portuguese and Galician) may be used as a place name or surname. It may refer to:

Places 
A Veiga, a municipality in Galicia, Spain
A Veiga or Vegadeo, a municipality in Asturias, Spain

People

Surname 
Alonso Pita da Veiga (died 1554), Spanish nobleman and military officer, famous for his deeds at the 1525 Battle of Pavia
Carlos Veiga (born 1949), second (and first democratically elected) Prime Minister of Cape Verde
Francisco da Veiga Beirão (1841-1916), Portuguese politician of the late period of the Constitutional Monarchy
Justino Veiga, São Tomé and Príncipean politician
Lourenço da Veiga, Portugal-born professional racecar driver
Mafalda Veiga (born 1965), Portuguese singer-songwriter
Maria do Rosario Veiga, see List of whistleblowers

See also
Vega, Spanish variant

Portuguese-language surnames
Galician-language surnames